(1542 – November 17, 1600) was a naval commander during Japan's Sengoku Period, under Oda Nobunaga, and later, Toyotomi Hideyoshi. He was also the ninth headmaster of the Kuki family's school of martial arts, Kukishin-ryū and thus a very skilled warrior.

Military life
In the 1570s, Kuki allied himself with Oda Nobunaga, and commanded his fleet, supporting land-based attacks on the Ikkō-ikki at Ise Bay.

In 1574, his aid ensured a victory for Nobunaga in his third attempt to attack the Nagashima fortress.

In 1575, Nobunaga allowed Yoshitaka to seize Shima Province, forcing out other maritime clans, such the Mukai clan.

In 1576, he was defeated at Kizugawaguchi by the Mōri clan fleet, but 1578 brought victory in the second Battle of Kizugawaguchi, in which Kuki used 'iron ships' to repel the arrows and musket balls of the opposing Mōri clan's ships.

In 1584, Yoshitaka along with Takigawa Kazumasu besieged Kanie castle, in Toyotomi Hideyoshi's campaign to consolidate his power over the lands held by the Oda clan in Owari province.

In 1587, he led Toyotomi Hideyoshi's fleet in a campaign in Kyūshū, alongside Konishi Yukinaga, Wakizaka Yasuharu and Katō Yoshiaki.

Three years later, along with Wakizaka Yasuharu and Kato Yoshiaki he went on to lead the Siege of Shimoda in the Odawara campaign 1590.

He continued in his role as commander of Hideyoshi's fleet, launching an invasion of Korea in 1592 from his flagship Nipponmaru, but he was severely defeated in the Battle of Myeongryang in 1597.

Death
In 1600, the Battle of Sekigahara, Kuki Yoshitaka fought alongside the Ishida Mitsunari forces, while his son Kuki Moritaka joined the opposing force, under Tokugawa Ieyasu.

Following Tokugawa's victory, his son successfully guaranteed Yoshitaka's safety from Ieyasu. In a turn of fate, Yoshitaka committed seppuku before the news from Moritaka reached him.

See also
Murakami Takeyoshi
Ohama Kagetaka

References

Ron, Roy (1999–2004). 'Genbukan Tokyo Shibu: Kuki Yoshitaka'. Ninpo.org Accessed 28 Dec 2004. Kuki Yoshitaka page.

Further reading

Samurai
1542 births
1600 deaths
Oda retainers
People of Sengoku-period Japan
16th-century Japanese people